Metachorista longiseta is a species of moth of the family Tortricidae first described by Józef Razowski in 2013. It is found on Seram Island in Indonesia.

The wingspan is about 18 mm. The ground colour of the forewings is white, somewhat strigulated (finely streaked) with yellow brown and yellow-brown spots. The hindwings are white.

Etymology
The species name refers to the size of the saccular setae.

References

Moths described in 2013
Schoenotenini